Perai River Bridge (Jambatan Sungai Perai in Malay) is a dual-three lane cable stayed bridge connecting the banks of the Perai River in Perai, Penang, Malaysia. It is part of the Butterworth Outer Ring Road (BORR).

Designed by Dar Al-Handasah Consultants, it won the IStructE Award for Transportation Structures and the prestigious Supreme Award in 2006. Constructed by Lingkaran Luar Butterworth (Penang) Sdn. Bhd. on a turnkey contract.

Project overview
The project was carried out by Turnkey contractor, Lingkaran Luar Butterworth (Penang) Sdn. Bhd. The main sub-contractors to the Turnkey contractor are Ballast Needam International (left halfway through the project), IJM Construction Sdn. Bhd. in joint venture with Zublin International (Malaysia) Sdn. Bhd. and consists of the following works: 
 A  glued segmental, cable stayed main span constructed by cantilever erection method.
 Three precast segmental exit/entry ramps constructed both by the use of an overhead launching gantry and, for some spans, a heavy duty falsework support system.
 Other items in the IJM-Zublin JV contract are the supply and erection of parapets, application of anti-carbonation paint and superstructure electrical works.

See also
 Penang Second Bridge
 Penang Bridge

References

External links
 The Butterworth Outer Ring Road (BORR)
 IStructE Supreme Award for Engineering Excellence: Sungai Prai Bridge

Bridges completed in 2005
Cable-stayed bridges in Malaysia